Riccardo Rossi (born 21 March 2002) is an Italian motorcycle rider, currently competing in Moto3 for Sic58 Squadra Corse.

Career statistics

Grand Prix motorcycle racing

By season

By class

Races by year
(key) (Races in bold indicate pole position; races in italics indicate fastest lap)

References

External links

2002 births
Living people
Sportspeople from Genoa
Italian motorcycle racers
Moto3 World Championship riders